"Kiss Me a Lot" is a song by English singer Morrissey. It is the eighth track on his World Peace Is None of Your Business album and was released as the fifth single off the album via digital download on 26 March 2015, through Atom Factory.

Of the release, Morrissey stated: "I humbly ask for all and any support with this download release, which, has always been waiting in the wings if not for unpleasant circumstances familiar enough not to be repeated here. Thank you to Atom Factory for making this happen, and here's to sound reason, good times, and music that matters."

Furthermore, artwork for the download has been enhanced by Rob English at Atom Factory using a previously unseen photograph taken by Terry Richardson.

On 5 April 2015, the official video for the song was announced on True-To-You, directed by Morrissey's nephew, Sam Esty Rayner. (Rayner had previously appeared as a young James Dean in his uncle's video for the song "Suedehead".)

Track listing
Digital download
 "Kiss Me a Lot" - 4:03

Personnel
 Morrissey – vocals

Additional musicians
 Boz Boorer – guitar 
 Jesse Tobias – guitar
 Solomon Walker – bass
 Matthew Walker – drums
 Gustavo Manzur – keyboards

Production
 Joe Chiccarelli – production

References

Songs about kissing
2014 songs
2015 singles
Morrissey songs
Songs written by Jesse Tobias
Songs written by Morrissey